Podor Department is one of the 46 departments of Senegal and one of the three in the Saint-Louis Region in the far north-west of the country.

Communes in the department are:
Golléré
Ndiandane
Ndioum
Podor
Mboumba
Guédé Chantier
Démette 
Galoya Toucouleur 
Aéré Lao 
Pété 
Walaldé 
Bodé Lao

Rural districts (Communautés rurales) comprise:
Arrondissement of Cas-Cas
 Méry
 Doumga Lao
 Madina Diathbé
Arrondissement of Gamadji Saré
 Gamadji Saré
 Dodel
 Guédé Village
Arrondissement of Saldé
Mbolo Birane
Boké Dialloubé
Arrondissement of Thillé Boubacar
Fanaye
Ndiayène Peindao

Historic sites

 The Fort at Podor
 Maison Foy at the corner of the quay in Podor
 The quays and quay buildings of Podor
 The mosque at Alwar 
 The Almamy cemetery at Mboumba
 The old mosque at Mboumba
 The mosque and mausoleum of Ouro Madiou
 The mosque of Diama Alwaly
 The old village of Walaldé
 The old village of Siouré
 The old village of Kaskas
 The mosque of Guédé Ouro
 The old village of Tioubalel

References

Departments of Senegal
Saint-Louis Region